Carla Braan (23 July 1961 – 23 April 2016) was a Dutch gymnast. She competed in six events at the 1976 Summer Olympics.

References

External links
 

1961 births
2016 deaths
Dutch female artistic gymnasts
Olympic gymnasts of the Netherlands
Gymnasts at the 1976 Summer Olympics
People from Volendam
Sportspeople from North Holland